The 3DO Company, also known as 3DO, was an American video game company. It was founded in 1991 by Electronic Arts founder Trip Hawkins, in a partnership with seven other companies. After 3DO's flagship video game console, the 3DO Interactive Multiplayer, failed in the marketplace, the company exited the hardware business and became a third-party video game developer. It went bankrupt in 2003 due to poor sales of its games. Its headquarters were in Redwood City, California, in the San Francisco Bay Area.

History

Console developer

Trip Hawkins wanted to get into the hardware market after the software market exploded with interest thanks to his involvement at Electronic Arts. When the company was first founded, its original objective was to create a next-generation CD-based video game system called the 3DO Interactive Multiplayer, which would be manufactured by various partners and licensees; 3DO would collect a royalty on each console sold and on each game manufactured. For game publishers, 3DO's $3 royalty per sold game was very low compared to the royalties Nintendo and Sega collected from game sales on their consoles. The launch of the console in October 1993 was well-promoted, with a great deal of attention in the mass media as part of the "multimedia wave" in the computer world.

The 3DO console launched in October 1993 at the price of US$699. Poor console and game sales trumped the enticingly low royalty rate and proved a fatal flaw. While 3DO's business model attracted game publishers with its low royalty rates, it resulted in the console selling for a price higher than the SNES and Sega Genesis combined, hampering sales. While companies that manufactured and sold their own consoles could sell them, at a loss, for a competitive price, making up for lost profit through royalties collected from game publishers, the 3DO's manufacturers, not collecting any money from game publishers, and owing royalties to the 3DO Company, had to sell the console for a profit, resulting in high prices. As the console failed to compete with its cheaper competitors, game developers and publishers, while initially attracted by low royalties, dropped support for the console as its games failed to sell. Stock in the 3DO Company dropped from over $37 per share in November 1993 to $23 per share in late December. Though the company's financial figures dramatically improved in the fiscal year ending March 1995, with revenues nearly triple that of the previous fiscal year, they were still operating at a loss. The console's prospects continued to improve through the first half of 1995 with a number of critical success, including winning the 1995 European Computer Trade Show award for best hardware.

In January 1996, The 3DO Company sold exclusive rights to its next generation console, M2, to Matsushita for $100 million. Thanks in part to revenues from the sale of M2 technology to Matsushita and other licensees, in the first quarter of 1996 the 3DO Company turned a profit for the first time since it was founded, with a net income of $1.2 million. Over the second half of 1996, the company restructured to focus on software development and online gaming, in the process cutting its staff from 450 to 300 employees. President Hugh Martin was given full operating control, while Hawkins remained with the company as chairman, CEO, and creative director.

Third-party developer
After selling the M2 technology to Matsushita, the company acquired Cyclone Studios, New World Computing, and Archetype Interactive. 3DO established a new office in Redmond, Washington devoted to PC games development, with Tony Garcia as its head. In mid-1997 it sold off its hardware business to Samsung for $20 million, making a final break from its origins as a console developer.

The company's biggest hit was its series of Army Men games, featuring generic green plastic soldier toys. Its Might and Magic and especially Heroes of Might and Magic series from subsidiary New World Computing were perhaps the most popular among their games at the time of release. During the late 1990s, the company published one of the first 3D MMORPGs: Meridian 59, which survives to this day in the hands of some of the game's original developers.

After struggling for several years, the company filed for Chapter 11 bankruptcy in May 2003. Employees were laid off without pay.

The company's game brands and other intellectual properties were sold to rivals like Microsoft (High Heat Baseball), Namco (Street Racing Syndicate), Take-Two Interactive (Army Men) and Ubisoft (Heroes of Might and Magic). Founder Trip Hawkins paid $405,000 for rights to some old brands and the company's "Internet patent portfolio".

In April 2020, over 30 of the company's titles were purchased from Prism Entertainment by Ziggurat Interactive.

List of games

Developed

Published

Canceled
 Army Men: Arcade Blasts
 Army Men: Platoon Command
 The Four Horsemen of the Apocalypse

Distributed (U.S. only)
 Pinball Builder: A Construction Kit for Windows
 Pinball Gold Pack

3DO Rating System

The 3DO Rating System was a rating system created by The 3DO Company and used on games released for the 3DO Interactive Multiplayer. The rating system, which went into use in March 1994, uses the following five categories:

E - Everyone
12 - Guidance for age 12 & under
16 - Guidance for age 16 & under (Japan only)
17 - Guidance for age 17 & under
AO - Adults Only

These ratings would appear on the lower front and back of the packaging, while the back of the packaging also specified what content was present in the game. In late 1994, the majority of 3DO's competitors signed on with a new rating system from the Entertainment Software Rating Board; despite this, the 3DO Company opted to continue providing their own rating system, leaving publishers of 3DO games to decide whether to use the 3DO Rating System or the new ESRB ratings. The 3DO rating for each game was designated voluntarily by the game's publisher, in contrast to the ESRB ratings, which were determined independently by the ESRB.

References

External links

 3DO.com on September 26, 2003 (courtesy of Internet Archive Wayback Machine)
 3DO.com index at Internet Archive Wayback Machine
 3DO profile on MobyGames

Video game development companies
Video game companies established in 1991
Video game companies disestablished in 2003
Companies that filed for Chapter 11 bankruptcy in 2003
3DO Interactive Multiplayer
Defunct video game companies of the United States
1991 establishments in California
2003 disestablishments in California
Defunct companies based in the San Francisco Bay Area